Brillio is a company focused on digital technologies and big data analytics headquartered in Santa Clara, California, United States

History 
Brillio was formed in 2014 when Collabera, an information technology (IT) recruiting and staffing company firm based in Morristown, New Jersey, spun off its IT services division.

In October 2014, Brillio acquired Marketelligent, a Bangalore-based analytics provider. founded in 2008.

In April 2015, Brillio legally incorporated as its own entity under Brillio Holdings, Inc. in New Castle County, Delaware and invested $3 million in Albeado, a Silicon Valley-based software company founded in 2010.
Mamodia was a director of Albeado and participated in its seed funding in October, 2014.
In October, 2015, Brillio invested in Arundo Analytics, a Norway-based provider of analytical and predictive software.
Arundo had received seed funding in July 2015 from Northgate Capital.

By 2016, Mamodia estimated 2,300 employees in the United States and India.

In 2018 and 2019, Brillio was mentioned in the trade press.

In March 2018, Brillio acquired Comity Designs, a cloud and mobile service provider and Salesforce.com consulting partner founded by Dushyant Pandya in 2008.
In January 2019, private equity firm Bain Capital acquired a majority stake in the company.
In August 2018, it announced it was in the Amazon Web Services (AWS) partner network.
In April 2019, it announced a partnership with the Blue Planet IT division of Ciena.
In December 2019, it became a Microsoft Azure managed service Provider (MSP).

In July 2020, Brillio announced the acquisition of Cognetik, based in Cary, North Carolina with offices in Romania.

In November 2021, Brillio acquired Standav.

References

2014 establishments in California
Companies based in Santa Clara, California
Information technology companies of the United States
2019 mergers and acquisitions